Nuclear Daydream is the fifth full-length album by Joseph Arthur, released on September 19, 2006. It was the first release through Joseph's own record label, Lonely Astronaut Records. The album version of "Enough to Get Away" was the first single in the UK to coincide with the album's release there. A music video was produced for "Slide Away," featuring Joseph and his band The Lonely Astronauts.

The album was released to positive reviews. Entertainment Weekly awarded the album 9.1 out of 10 stars, and Allmusic said of the album: "Without it ever deliberately going for the jugular, Nuclear Daydream is nevertheless an album that is difficult to shake out of your ears; moreover, it's one that only grows stronger with every repeated play."

Joseph discussed the making of Nuclear Daydream in an interview with Newsday:

Nuclear Daydream was reissued in Europe by Fargo Records on October 6, 2009 on CD (in a mini-LP sleeve with lyrics booklet) and double heavyweight vinyl (in a gatefold sleeve). The new edition includes six previously unreleased bonus tracks that were recorded during the album's sessions.

Track listing

Release history

Singles
 "Enough to Get Away" (August 27, 2007)

Album credits
 All songs written and produced by Joseph Arthur.
 Additional production on "Too Much to Hide" by David Kosten.
 Additional production on "Electrical Storm" and "When I Was Running Out of Time" by Mark Bihler.
 Additional production on "Nuclear Daydream" by Gary Go and Andreas Wickmann.
 "Too Much to Hide"
 Joseph Arthur: guitars, bass, synth and vocals
 Brian Geltner: drums
 Mixed by Joseph Arthur, Matt Boynton and David Kosten
 Additional mixing and synth by David Kosten
 Recorded by Matt Boynton and Dawn Landes
 "Black Lexus"
 Joseph Arthur: all instruments and vocals
 Recorded and mixed by Joseph Arthur and Mathias Schneeberger
 "Enough to Get Away"
 Joseph Arthur: all instruments and vocals
 Recorded and mixed by Joseph Arthur, Mike Napolitano and Mathias Schneeberger
 "Slide Away"
 Joseph Arthur: electric and acoustic guitars, bass, drums, synth, lead and background vocals
 Kenny Siegal: lead guitar and background vocals
 Recorded and mixed by Joseph Arthur and Mathias Schneeberger
 Additional engineering by Mike Napolitano
 "Electrical Storm"
 Joseph Arthur: acoustic guitar, bass, theremin and vocals
 Mark Bihler: Russian synths
 Gary Go: piano
 Mixed by Joseph Arthur and Mark Bihler
 Recorded by Vitaliano Zurlo
 "You Are Free"
 Joseph Arthur: acoustic and electric guitars, bass, synth, percussion, lead and background vocals
 Rene Lopez: drums
 Joan Wasser: violin
 Kenny Siegal: background vocals
 Recorded and mixed by Joseph Arthur and Mathias Schneeberger
 Additional engineering by Mike Napolitano
 "Automatic Situation"
 Joseph Arthur: electric piano, bass, synth, lead and background vocals
 Sean Porres, a.k.a. "Y": background vocals and sha energy
 Hoss: drums
 Recorded by Mathias Schneeberger and "Y"
 "When I Was Running Out of Time"
 Joseph Arthur: acoustic guitars and vocals
 Mixed by Joseph Arthur and Mark Bihler
 Recorded by Mark Bihler and Vitaliano Zurlo
 "Don't Tell Your Eyes (Jesus Loves You More Than You Know)"
 Joseph Arthur: acoustic guitar, drums, piano and vocals
 Mark Bihler: drum machine and hohner rhythm
 Mixed by Joseph Arthur and Mark Bihler
 Recorded by Mark Bihler and Vitaliano Zurlo
 "Don't Give Up on People"
 Joseph Arthur: piano, bass, drums, synth and vocals
 Recorded and mixed by Joseph Arthur
 Additional engineering by Mike Napolitano
 "Woman"
 Joseph Arthur: guitar, drums and vocals
 Recorded by Joseph Arthur
 Mixed by Joseph Arthur and Mathias Schneeberger
 "Nuclear Daydream"
 Joseph Arthur: acoustic guitar, bass and vocals
 Gary Go: piano and synth
 Recorded by Gary Go and Andreas Wickmann
 Mixed by Joseph Arthur, Gary Go and Andreas Wickmann
 "Can't Let You Stay"
 Joseph Arthur: acoustic guitar and vocals
 "Moon in the Skull (Long Way Down)"
 Joseph Arthur: guitars, synthesizer, percussion and vocals
 Greg Wieczorek: drums
 "Flashing Lights and Cockfights"
 Joseph Arthur: acoustic guitar, bass and vocals
 Gary Go: piano
 "My Eyes Follow You"
 Joseph Arthur: bass, synthesizer, percussion and vocals
 Greg Wieczorek: drums
 "I Love You"
 Joseph Arthur: all instruments and vocals
 "Hard to See"
 Joseph Arthur: all instruments and vocals
 Mastered by Fred Kevorkian at Kevorkian Mastering, Inc.
 Artwork by Davies.
 Photographs by Cerise Leang.
 Design by Davies and Cerise Leang.
 Layout by Cerise Leang, Konsol and Lauren Pattenaude.

References

Joseph Arthur albums
2006 albums
Lonely Astronaut Records albums